Gertrude Ann Breault (December 15, 1938 – September 26, 2021) was a teacher, nurse, journalist, and politician in New Brunswick, Canada. Known by "Ann," she represented St. Stephen-Milltown and then Western Charlotte in the Legislative Assembly of New Brunswick from 1987 to 1999 as a Liberal member.

Breault served in the province's Executive Council as Minister of Income Assistance (later Minister of Human Resources), Minister of State for Literacy, Minister of Municipalities, Culture and Housing and Minister of Health and Community Services. Breault retired from politics in 1999. She helped found the Fundy Region Transition House and the Charlotte County Day Care Centre.

Ann Breault was a mother of six, and has several grandchildren.

References 

 List of Women MLAs, New Brunswick Legislative Library
 Entry from Canadian Who's Who

1938 births
2021 deaths
New Brunswick Liberal Association MLAs
Members of the Executive Council of New Brunswick
People from Moncton
People from Charlotte County, New Brunswick
Women MLAs in New Brunswick
Women government ministers of Canada
Health ministers of New Brunswick